Claudiu Cristian Moldovan (born 20 September 1976 in Târgu Mureș) is a retired Romanian aerobic gymnast. He had a successful career winning seven world championships medals (three gold, two silver and two bronze) and two European championships medals (one gold and one bronze).   After retiring from aerobic gymnastics, he has been a coach for the junior national women's artistic gymnastics team. Among many gymnasts, he coached young Diana Chelaru, Larisa Iordache and Diana Bulimar.

References

External links

1974 births
Living people
Sportspeople from Târgu Mureș
Romanian aerobic gymnasts
Male aerobic gymnasts
Romanian gymnastics coaches
Medalists at the Aerobic Gymnastics World Championships